Scalicus investigatoris is a species of marine ray-finned fish belonging to the family Peristediidae, the armoured gurnards or armored sea robins. This species is found in the Indo-Pacific region. Some authorities regard S, investigatoris as a junior synonyms of S. engyceros.

References 

investigatoris
Animals described in 1898